Andre James (born May 2, 1997) is an American football center for the Las Vegas Raiders of the National Football League (NFL). He played college football at UCLA.

Early life and high school
James grew up in South Jordan, Utah, and attended Herriman High School, where he was a member of the football and track and field teams. He was named first-team All-State as a senior at offensive tackle. James was also a three time class 5A state champion in the shot put. He was rated a four-star recruit and committed to play college football at UCLA over offers from Oregon, USC, Ohio State, Oklahoma and Utah.

College career
James was a member of the UCLA Bruins, redshirting his true freshman season. He became a starter during his redshirt freshman season following an injury to Kolton Miller. James started the final 32 games of his collegiate career, appearing in 35 games total. As a redshirt junior, he made the decision to play in the Bruins' week seven game against Arizona and continue his consecutive games started streak despite his father passing away of cancer earlier that week. James declared for the NFL Draft on December 18, 2018, forgoing his final season of NCAA eligibility.

Professional career

James signed with the Oakland Raiders as an undrafted free agent on May 3, 2019. He made his NFL debut on September 9, 2019, against the Denver Broncos. He made his first career start at center in Week 9 in place of the injured Rodney Hudson. James appeared in 12 games with one start as a rookie.

On March 22, 2021, the Raiders signed James to a three-year, $12.5 contract extension through the 2023 season.

References

External links
UCLA Bruins profile
Las Vegas Raiders bio

1997 births
Living people
People from Herriman, Utah
Players of American football from Utah
American football offensive tackles
UCLA Bruins football players
Las Vegas Raiders players
Oakland Raiders players